The Ibn Báya Ensemble (Arabic: مجموعة ابن باجة) is a Spanish-Moroccan early music ensemble formed in 1994.

The ensemble takes its name from Avempace - Abū-Bakr Muhammad ibn Yahya ibn al-Sāyigh (Arabic أبو بكر محمد بن يحيى بن الصائغ), also known as Ibn Baya (Arabic: ابن باجة), the Arab Andalusian polymath who was also a musician, and is dedicated to the music of medieval Arab Spain. The founding members were Eduardo Paniagua and Omar Metioui.

Selected discography
 Ibn 'Arabi: El intérprete de los deseos . Ensemble Ibn Bàya PN 360
 Jardín de Al-Andalus
 Walladah (Córdoba 994-1077) and Ibn Zaygun (Córdoba 1003-1071)
 La Llamada de Al-Andalus
 Núba Al-Maya
 El Agua de la Alhambra
 La Felicidad Cumplida
 Nuba Al-Istihlal'
 Poemas de la Alhambra
 Alarifes Mudéjares

See also
 Mohammed El-Arabi Serghini, Moroccan classical musician
 Salim Fergani, Algerian oud player and classical singer

References

Moroccan musical groups
Andalusian music
Early music groups
Musical groups established in 1994